Kannus is a town and municipality of Finland. It is situated in the province of Western Finland and is part of the Central Ostrobothnia region. The municipality is unilingually Finnish. Neighbour municipalities are Kalajoki, Kokkola, Sievi and Toholampi.

The area of ​​Kannus was long inhabited by Lapps. This is also indicated by the name of the town, which means Sámi witch drum. The hammer of the witch drum in the coat of arms of the town also refers to the same.

Notable people
 Oskari Tokoi, socialist leader and the Chairman of the Senate of Finland

References

External links

Town of Kannus – official website

Cities and towns in Finland
Municipalities of Central Ostrobothnia
Populated places established in 1859
1859 establishments in Finland